Sackville Street may refer to:
Sackville Street (Dublin) (before 1924, now known as O'Connell Street), Dublin's main thoroughfare.
Sackville Street (London), a street in central London, England.
Sackville Street (Manchester), a street in central Manchester, England and also the name of a large, historic building on that street.